Andrey Korjenkov is a Kyrgyz seismologist and geologist.

Korjenkov is a member of the Kyrgyz Institute of Seismology and the Kyrgyz Academy of Sciences. One of his papers is based on his geological research into the Chong-Kemin Valley, entitled, "Long-Term Preservation of Paleoseismic Deformations as a Tool for Revealing Traces of Ancient Seismic Catastrophes".

References

Kyrgyzstani scientists
Kyrgyzstani geologists
Seismologists
Living people
Year of birth missing (living people)